The ICF World Junior and U23 Canoe Slalom Championships are an annual international canoeing and kayaking event organized by the International Canoe Federation (ICF). The Junior World Championships were first held in 1986 and then every two years until 2012. The Under-23 category has been added to the program in 2012. Since then the championships have been held annually. Athletes under the age of 18 are eligible for the junior category.

Summary

Medal tables
As of the 2022 Championships.

Junior

Under-23

Junior medalists

Canoe Single (C1) Boys

Canoe Double (C2) Boys
Discontinued: 2017.

Kayak (K1) Boys

Extreme Kayak (K1) Boys

Canoe Single (C1) Girls

Kayak (K1) Girls

Extreme Kayak (K1) Girls

Canoe Double (C2) Mixed

Canoe Single (C1) Boys Teams

Canoe Double (C2) Boys Teams
Discontinued: 2016.

Kayak (K1) Boys Teams

Canoe Single (C1) Girls Teams

Kayak (K1) Girls Teams

Under 23 Medalists

Canoe Single (C1) Men

Canoe Double (C2) Men
Discontinued: 2017.

Kayak (K1) Men

Extreme Kayak (K1) Men

Canoe Single (C1) Women

Kayak (K1) Women

Extreme Kayak (K1) Women

Canoe Double (C2) Mixed

Canoe Single (C1) Men Teams

Canoe Double (C2) Men Teams
Discontinued: 2017.

Kayak (K1) Men Teams

Canoe Single (C1) Women Teams

Kayak (K1) Women Teams

See also
ICF Canoe Slalom World Championships
European Junior and U23 Canoe Slalom Championships

References

U23 Championships results archive
Junior Championships results archive

External links
 International Canoe Federation

 
World championships in canoeing and kayaking
Canoe slalom
World youth sports competitions
Recurring sporting events established in 1986